In mathematics, specifically group theory, a descendant tree is a hierarchical structure that visualizes parent-descendant relations between isomorphism classes of finite groups of prime power order , for a fixed prime number  and varying integer exponents . Such groups are briefly called finite p-groups. The vertices of a descendant tree are isomorphism classes of finite p-groups.

Additionally to their order , finite p-groups have two further related invariants, the nilpotency class  and the coclass . It turned out that descendant trees of a particular kind, the so-called pruned coclass trees whose infinitely many vertices share a common coclass , reveal a repeating finite pattern. These two crucial properties of finiteness and periodicity admit a characterization of all members of the tree by finitely many parametrized presentations. Consequently, descendant trees play a fundamental role in the classification of finite p-groups. By means of kernels and targets of Artin transfer homomorphisms, descendant trees can be endowed with additional structure.

An important question is how the descendant tree  can actually be constructed for an assigned starting group which is taken as the root   of the tree. The p-group generation algorithm is a recursive process for constructing the descendant tree of a given finite p-group playing the role of the tree root. This algorithm is implemented in the computational algebra systems GAP and Magma.

Definitions and terminology
According to M. F. Newman, there exist several distinct definitions of the parent  of a finite p-group .

The former convention is adopted by C. R. Leedham-Green and M. F. Newman, by M. du Sautoy and D. Segal, by C. R. Leedham-Green and S. McKay, and by B. Eick, C. R. Leedham-Green, M. F. Newman and E. A. O'Brien. The latter definition is used by M. F. Newman, by M. F. Newman and E. A. O'Brien, by M. du Sautoy, and by B. Eick and C. R. Leedham-Green.

In the following, the direction of the canonical projections is selected for all edges. Then, more generally, a vertex  is a descendant of a vertex ,

The maximal possible descendant tree  of the trivial group  contains all finite p-groups and is somewhat exceptional, since, for any parent definition (P1–P4), the trivial group  has infinitely many abelian p-groups as its immediate descendants. The parent definitions (P2–P3) have the advantage that any non-trivial finite p-group (of order divisible by ) possesses only finitely many immediate descendants.

Pro-p groups and coclass trees
For a sound understanding of coclass trees as a particular instance of descendant trees,
it is necessary to summarize some facts concerning infinite topological pro-p groups.
are closed (and open) subgroups of finite index, and therefore the corresponding quotients  are finite p-groups.
The pro-p group  is said to be of coclass 
when the limit  of the coclass of the successive quotients exists and is finite.
An infinite pro-p group  of coclass  is a p-adic pre-space group
,
since it has a normal subgroup , the translation group,
which is a free module over the ring  of p-adic integers of uniquely determined rank , the dimension,
such that the quotient  is a finite p-group, the point group, which acts on  uniserially.
The dimension is given by

A central finiteness result for infinite pro-p groups of coclass  is provided by the so-called Theorem D,
which is one of the five Coclass Theorems proved in 1994 independently by A. Shalev

and by C. R. Leedham-Green
,
and conjectured in 1980 already by C. R. Leedham-Green and M. F. Newman.
Theorem D asserts that there are only finitely many isomorphism classes of infinite pro-p groups of coclass ,
for any fixed prime  and any fixed non-negative integer .
As a consequence, if  is an infinite pro-p group of coclass , then
there exists a minimal integer  such that the following three conditions are satisfied for any integer .

,
 is cyclic of order .

The descendant tree , with respect to the parent definition (P2),
of the root  with minimal  is called the coclass tree  of 
and its unique maximal infinite (reverse-directed) path

is called the mainline (or trunk) of the tree.

Tree diagram
Further terminology, used in diagrams visualizing finite parts of descendant trees, is explained in Figure 1 by means of an artificial abstract tree.
On the left hand side, a level indicates the basic top-down design of a descendant tree.
For concrete trees, such as those in Figure 2, resp. Figure 3, etc., the level is usually replaced by a scale of orders increasing from the top to the bottom.
A vertex is capable (or extendable) if it has at least one immediate descendant, otherwise it is terminal (or a leaf).
Vertices sharing a common parent are called siblings.

If the descendant tree is a coclass tree  with root 
and with mainline vertices  labelled according to the level ,
then the finite subtree defined as the difference set

is called the nth branch (or twig) of the tree or also the branch  with root , for any .
The depth of a branch is the maximal length of the paths connecting its vertices with its root.
Figure 1 shows an artificial abstract coclass tree whose branches  and  both have depth ,
If all vertices of depth bigger than a given integer  are removed from the branch ,
then we obtain the depth- pruned branch .
Correspondingly, the depth- pruned coclass tree , resp. the entire coclass tree ,
consists of the infinite sequence of its pruned branches , resp. branches ,
connected by the mainline, whose vertices  are called infinitely capable.

Virtual periodicity
The periodicity of branches of depth-pruned coclass trees
has been proved with analytic methods using zeta functions

of groups by M. du Sautoy
,
and with algebraic techniques using cohomology groups by B. Eick and C. R. Leedham-Green
.
The former methods admit the qualitative insight of ultimate virtual periodicity,
the latter techniques determine the quantitative structure.

Theorem.
For any infinite pro-p group  of coclass  and dimension ,
and for any given depth ,
there exists an effective minimal lower bound ,
where periodicity of length  of pruned branches of the coclass tree  sets in,
that is, there exist graph isomorphisms

 for all .

For the proof, click show on the right hand side.

The graph isomorphisms of depth- pruned branches with roots of sufficiently large order 
are derived with cohomological methods in Theorem 6, p. 277 and Theorem 9, p. 278 by Eick and Leedham-Green

and the effective lower bound  for the branch root orders is established in Theorem 29, p. 287, of this article.

These central results can be expressed ostensively:
When we look at a coclass tree through a pair of blinkers
and ignore a finite number of pre-periodic branches at the top,
then we shall see a repeating finite pattern (ultimate periodicity).
However, if we take wider blinkers
the pre-periodic initial section may become longer (virtual periodicity).

The vertex  is called the periodic root of the pruned coclass tree, for a fixed value of the depth .
See Figure 1.

Multifurcation and coclass graphs
Assume that parents of finite p-groups are defined as last non-trivial lower central quotients (P2).
For a p-group  of coclass ,
we can distinguish its (entire) descendant tree 
and its coclass- descendant tree ,
that is the subtree consisting of descendants of coclass  only.
The group  is called coclass-settled if ,

The nuclear rank  of 
in the theory of the p-group generation algorithm by M. F. Newman

and E. A. O'Brien

provides the following criteria.

 is terminal, and thus trivially coclass-settled, if and only if .
If , then  is capable, but it remains unknown whether  is coclass-settled.
If , then  is capable and definitely not coclass-settled.

In the last case, a more precise assertion is possible:
If  has coclass  and nuclear rank , then it gives rise to
an m-fold multifurcation
into a regular coclass-r descendant tree 
and  irregular descendant graphs  of coclass ,

.

Multifurcation is correlated with different orders of the last non-trivial lower central of immediate descendants.
Since the nilpotency class increases exactly by a unit,
from a parent  to any immediate descendant ,
the coclass remains stable,
if the last non-trivial lower central is cyclic of order ,
since then the exponent of the order also increases exactly by a unit,  .
In this case,  is a regular immediate descendant with directed edge  of step size , as usual.
Then  is called an irregular immediate descendant with directed edge  of step size .

If the condition of step size  is imposed on all directed edges, then the maximal descendant tree  of the trivial group 
splits into a countably infinite disjoint union

of directed coclass graphs ,
which are rather forests than trees.
More precisely, the above-mentioned Coclass Theorems imply that

is the disjoint union of
finitely many coclass trees  of pairwise non-isomorphic infinite pro-p groups  of coclass  (Theorem D)
and a finite subgraph  of sporadic groups lying outside of any coclass tree.

Identifiers
The SmallGroups Library identifiers of finite groups, in particular of finite p-groups, given in the form

in the following concrete examples of descendant trees,
are due to H. U. Besche, B. Eick and E. A. O'Brien
.

When the group orders are given in a scale on the left hand side, as in Figure 2 and Figure 3,
the identifiers are briefly denoted by

.

Depending on the prime , there is an upper bound on the order of groups for which a SmallGroup identifier exists,
For groups of bigger orders, a notation with generalized identifiers resembling the descendant structure is employed.
A regular immediate descendant, connected by an edge of step size  with its parent , is denoted by

,

and an irregular immediate descendant, connected by an edge of step size  with its parent , is denoted by

.

The implementations of the p-group generation algorithm
in the computational algebra systems GAP and Magma
use these generalized identifiers, which go back to J. A. Ascione in 1979
.

Concrete examples of trees
In all examples, the underlying parent definition (P2) corresponds to the usual lower central series.
Occasional differences to the parent definition (P3) with respect to the lower exponent-p central series are pointed out.

Coclass 0
The coclass graph

of finite p-groups of coclass  does not contain any coclass tree
and thus exclusively consists of sporadic groups, 
namely the trivial group  and the cyclic group  of order , which is a leaf
(however, it is capable with respect to the lower exponent-p central series).

Coclass 1
The coclass graph

of finite p-groups of coclass , also called of maximal class,
consists of the unique coclass tree  with root ,
the elementary abelian p-group of rank ,
and a single isolated vertex
(a terminal orphan without proper parent in the same coclass graph,
since the directed edge to the trivial group  has step size ),
the cyclic group  of order  in the sporadic part 
(however, this group is capable with respect to the lower exponent-p central series).
The tree  is the coclass tree
of the unique infinite pro-p group  of coclass .

For , resp. ,
,
and a tree diagram of the coclass graph from branch  down to branch 
(counted with respect to the p-logarithm of the order of the branch root)
is drawn in Figure 2, resp.  Figure 3,
where all groups of order at least  are metabelian, that is non-abelian with derived length 
(vertices represented by black discs in contrast to contour squares indicating abelian groups).
In Figure 3, smaller black discs denote metabelian 3-groups where even the maximal subgroups are non-abelian,
a feature which does not occur for the metabelian 2-groups in Figure 2,
since they all possess an abelian subgroup of index  (usually exactly one).
,
has periodic root  and periodicity of length  starting with branch ,
resp. periodic root  and periodicity of length  setting in with branch .
Both trees have branches of bounded depth , so their virtual periodicity is in fact a strict periodicity.

that is, the number of descendants of a fixed order increases indefinitely with growing order
.

With the aid of kernels and targets of Artin transfers, the diagrams in Figure 2 and Figure 3 can be endowed with additional information
and redrawn as structured descendant trees.

provide an opportunity to give a parametrized polycyclic power-commutator presentation

mentioned in the lead section as a benefit of the descendant tree concept and as a consequence of the periodicity of the entire coclass tree.
In both cases, a group  is generated by two elements 
starting with the main commutator .
The nilpotency is formally expressed by the relation , when the group is of order .

For , there are two parameters  and the pc-presentation is given by

The 2-groups of maximal class, that is of coclass , form three periodic infinite sequences,

the dihedral groups, forming the mainline (with infinitely capable vertices),
the generalized quaternion groups, which are all terminal vertices,
the semidihedral groups, which are also leaves.

3-groups with parameter  possess an abelian maximal subgroup, those with parameter  do not.
More precisely, an existing abelian maximal subgroup is unique,

In contrast to any bigger coclass ,
the coclass graph  exclusively contains p-groups  with abelianization  of type , except for its unique isolated vertex .
The case  is distinguished by the truth of the reverse statement:
Any 2-group with abelianization of type  is of coclass  (O. Taussky's Theorem
).

Coclass 2
p-groups with several distinct abelianizations contribute to its constitution.
For coclass , there are essential contributions from groups  with abelianizations   of the types

.

Abelianization of type (p,p)
which arise as regular descendants of abelian p-groups of the same types,
p-groups of coclass  with abelianization of type 
arise from irregular descendants of a non-abelian p-group of coclass  which is not coclass-settled.

For the prime , such groups do not exist at all,
since the 2-group  is coclass settled,
which is the deeper reason for Taussky's Theorem.
This remarkable fact has been observed by Giuseppe Bagnera

in 1898 already.

For odd primes ,
the existence of p-groups of coclass  with abelianization of type 
is due to the fact that the group  is not coclass-settled.
Its nuclear rank equals , which gives rise to a bifurcation of the descendant tree  into two coclass graphs.
The regular component 
is a subtree of the unique tree  in the coclass graph .
The irregular component 
becomes a subgraph  of the coclass graph 

For , this subgraph  is drawn in Figure 4,
 has seven top level vertices of three important kinds, all having order ,
which have been discovered by G. Bagnera
.

However, since they are not coclass-settled, the complete trees  are infinite .
Finally, the three groups ,  and  give rise to (infinite) coclass trees, e.g., each having a metabelian mainline, in the coclass graph . None of these three groups is coclass-settled.

Displaying additional information on kernels and targets of Artin transfers,
we can draw these trees as structured descendant trees.

Definition.
Generally, a Schur group (called a closed group by I. Schur, who coined the concept)
is a pro-p group  whose
relation rank  coincides with its
generator rank .
A σ-group is a pro-p group  which
possesses an automorphism 
inducing the inversion  on its abelianization .
A Schur σ-group is a Schur group  which is also a σ-group and has a finite abelianization .

 is not root of a coclass tree,

since its immediate descendant ,
which is root of a coclass tree with metabelian mainline vertices,
has two siblings , resp. ,
which give rise to a single, resp. three, coclass tree(s) with non-metabelian mainline vertices having cyclic centres of order 
and branches of considerable complexity but nevertheless of bounded depth .

Pro-3 groups of coclass 2 with non-trivial centre
B. Eick, C. R. Leedham-Green, M. F. Newman and E. A. O'Brien 
have constructed a family of infinite pro-3 groups with coclass  having a non-trivial centre of order .
The family members are characterized by three parameters .
Their finite quotients generate all mainline vertices with bicyclic centres of type  of six coclass trees in the coclass graph .
The association of parameters to the roots of these six trees is given in Table 1,
the tree diagrams, except for the abelianization , are indicated in Figure 4 and Figure 5, and
the parametrized pro-3 presentation is given by

Abelianization of type (p²,p)
For ,
the top levels of the subtree  of the coclass graph  are drawn in Figure 5.
The most important vertices of this tree are the eight siblings sharing the common parent , which are of three important kinds.

Secondly, the group  is root of a finite tree .
Finally, the three groups ,  and  give rise to infinite coclass trees, e.g., each having a metabelian mainline, the first with cyclic centres of order , the second and third with bicyclic centres of type .

Here,  is not root of a coclass tree,
since aside from its descendant ,
which is root of a coclass tree with metabelian mainline vertices,
it possesses five further descendants
which give rise to coclass trees with non-metabelian mainline vertices having cyclic centres of order 
and branches of extreme complexity, here partially even with unbounded depth.

Abelianization of type (p,p,p)
For , resp. ,
there exists a unique coclass tree with p-groups of type  in the coclass graph .
Its root is the elementary abelian p-group of type , that is, resp. .
This unique tree corresponds to the pro-2 group of the family  by M. F. Newman and E. A. O'Brien,
resp. to the pro-3 group given by the parameters  in Table 1.
For , the tree is indicated in Figure 6,
which shows some finite 2-groups with coclass  of type .

Coclass 3
Here again, p-groups with several distinct abelianizations contribute to the constitution of the coclass graph .
There are regular, resp. irregular, essential contributions from groups  with abelianizations  of the types

Abelianization of type (p,p,p)
Since the elementary abelian p-group  of rank , that is,
, resp. ,
is not coclass-settled, it gives rise to a multifurcation.
The regular component  has been described in the section about coclass .
The irregular component 
becomes a subgraph  of the coclass graph 

For , this subgraph  is contained in Figure 6.
It has nine top level vertices of order  which can be divided into terminal and capable vertices.

 The five groups  and the two groups  are infinitely capable.

The trees arising from the capable vertices are associated with infinite pro-2 groups by M. F. Newman and E. A. O'Brien

in the following manner.

 gives rise to two trees,

 associated with family ,
and

 associated with family .

 is associated with family .

 is associated with family .

 is associated with family .

 gives rise to

 associated with family . Finally,

 is associated with family .

Hall-Senior classification of 2-groups
Seven of these nine top level vertices have been investigated by E. Benjamin, F. Lemmermeyer and C. Snyder

with respect to their occurrence as class-2 quotients 
of bigger metabelian 2-groups  of type  and with coclass ,
which are exactly the members of the descendant trees of the seven vertices.
These authors use the classification of 2-groups by M. Hall and J. K. Senior

which is put in correspondence with the SmallGroups Library  in Table 2.
The complexity of the descendant trees of these seven vertices increases with the 2-ranks and 4-ranks indicated in Table 2,

History
Descendant trees with central quotients as parents (P1) are implicit in P. Hall's 1940 paper

about isoclinism of groups.
Trees with last non-trivial lower central quotients as parents (P2) were first presented by C. R. Leedham-Green
at the International Congress of Mathematicians in Vancouver, 1974
.
The first extensive tree diagrams have been drawn manually
by J. A. Ascione, G. Havas and C. R. Leedham-Green (1977)
,
by J. A. Ascione (1979)
,
and by B. Nebelung (1989)
.
In the former two cases, the parent definition by means of the lower exponent-p central series (P3) was adopted in view of computational advantages, in the latter case, where theoretical aspects were focussed, the parents were taken with respect to the usual lower central series (P2).

See also
 The kernels and targets of Artin transfers have recently turned out to be compatible with parent-descendant relations between finite p-groups and can favourably be used to endow descendant trees with additional structure.

References

Group theory
P-groups
Subgroup series
Topological groups
Trees (data structures)